Wugang is a county-level city in the south-central part of Henan province, China, administrated by Pingdingshan prefecture-level city. It has a population of approximately 320,000. It is home to one of China's biggest iron and steel companies: Wuyang Iron and Steel Company Limited, Hangang Group. Longquan Lake (Shimantan Reservoir) is located at the foot of the city with beautiful mountains surrounding it. This place has now become a hot tourist destination to neighbouring cities and provinces. The city region comprises three geological areas including Sipo, Yakou and Zhulan.

Administrative divisions
As 2012, this city is divided to 5 subdistricts, 3 towns and 5 townships.
Subdistricts

Towns
Shangdian
Batai
Yinji

Townships

Climate

References

Cities in Henan
County-level divisions of Henan
Pingdingshan